Chester Gap, sometimes referred to as  Happy Creek Gap for the creek that runs down its western slope, is a wind gap in the Blue Ridge Mountains on the border of Rappahannock County, Fauquier County and Warren County in Virginia.  The gap is traversed by U.S. Route 522.  The Appalachian trail also passes across the gap, with a trailhead at the gap.

Geography

The census-designated place of Chester Gap is located within and immediately south of the gap. Just to the west of the gap is the northern end of Shenandoah National Park. Immediately north of the gap is the town of Front Royal.

References

Landforms of Fauquier County, Virginia
Landforms of Warren County, Virginia
Landforms of Rappahannock County, Virginia
Wind gaps of Virginia
Blue Ridge Mountains
Rappahannock River